Kei Nishikori was the defending champion, but decided not to participate.

Paul Capdeville defeated Wayne Odesnik 7–6(7–4), 6–3 in the final to win this tournament.

Seeds

Draw

Finals

Top half

Bottom half

References
 Main draw
 Qualifying draw

Singles